The 2014–15 East Carolina Pirates women's basketball team will represent East Carolina University during the 2014–15 NCAA Division I women's basketball season. The season marks the first for the Pirates as members of the American Athletic Conference. The team, coached by 5th year head coach Heather Macy, plays their home games at Williams Arena at Minges Coliseum. They finished the season 22–11, 11–7 in AAC play to finish in a tie for fifth place. They advanced to the quarterfinals of the American Athletic women's tournament where they lost to Connecticut. They were invited to the Women's National Invitational Tournament where defeated Radford in the first round before losing to NC State in the second round.

Media
All Pirates home games will have a video stream on Pirates All Access, ESPN3, or AAC Digital. Road games will typically be streamed on the opponents website, though conference road games could also appear on ESPN3 or AAC Digital. Audio broadcasts for most road games can also be found on the opponents website.

Roster

Schedule and results

|-
!colspan=12 style="background:#4F0076; color:#FFE600;"| Regular Season

|-
!colspan=12 style="background:#4B1869;"| AAC Women's Tournament

|-
!colspan=12 style="background:#4B1869;"|WNIT

See also
2014–15 East Carolina Pirates men's basketball team

References

East Carolina
East Carolina Pirates women's basketball seasons
2015 Women's National Invitation Tournament participants